Bruce Reid (born 23 December 1955) is a former Australian rules footballer who played with Footscray and Carlton in the Victorian Football League (VFL). Reid made his league debut against St Kilda in round 5 of the 1977 season. His father Bruce Reid Sr. and brother John Reid were also league footballers.

Notes

External links 

Bruce Reid's profile at Blueseum

1955 births
Carlton Football Club players
Western Bulldogs players
Sandhurst Football Club players
Australian rules footballers from Victoria (Australia)
Living people